Tyler Pizarro (born May 8, 1986 in Bolton, Ontario) is a Canadian champion jockey in Thoroughbred horse racing based at Woodbine Racetrack in Toronto, Ontario.

The son of former jockey Jorge Pizarro, his mother Donna is a trainer at Woodbine Racetrack. As a boy, Pizarro began galloping horses on a farm then by age sixteen was dedicated to following in his father's footsteps and was galloping horses on a track. Turning professional in late 2005, he earned his first win on September 2, 2006 and in 2007 won 124 races at Woodbine Racetrack, more than any other apprentice jockey. His 2007 performance earned him the Sovereign Award for Outstanding Apprentice Jockey and was a finalist for the United States' Eclipse Award for Outstanding Apprentice Jockey.

On October 25, 2008, Pizarro earned his first Grade II win with a victory aboard Lauro in the Sky Classic Stakes.

Year-end charts

References
 2007 Sovereign Awards
 Biography for Tyler Pizarro at Woodbine Entertainment

1986 births
Living people
Canadian jockeys
Sovereign Award winners
People from Caledon, Ontario